Romania competed at the 2012 European Athletics Championships in Helsinki, Finland, from 27 June to 1 July 2012. It did not win any medals.

Results

Men

Track

Field

Women

Track

Field

Sources

Nations at the 2012 European Athletics Championships
Romania at the European Athletics Championships
European Athletics Championships